Hub Cap is an album by trumpeter Freddie Hubbard and was released on the Blue Note label in 1961 as BLP 4073 and BST 84073. It features performances by Hubbard, Julian Priester, Jimmy Heath, Cedar Walton, Larry Ridley and Philly Joe Jones.

The pieces
The album's title originates from Hubbard's nickname. The track "Cry Me Not", composed by Randy Weston for the session and arranged by Melba Liston, was considered by Hubbard to be "the most interesting tune on the record". "Luana" is dedicated to Hubbard's niece, whilst "Osie Mae" – a title which sounded "funky" to Hubbard – is characterized by an A-B-A-B pattern. "Earmon Jr.", composed by Hubbard and arranged by Ed Summerlin, was named for Hubbard's brother, a pianist.

Reception
Reviewing the album for The Guardian in 2003, British jazz critic John Fordham wrote:

Track listing

All compositions by Freddie Hubbard, except as indicated
 "Hub Cap" – 5:17
 "Cry Me Not" (Randy Weston) – 4:49
 "Luana" – 10:04
 "Osie Mae" – 6:53
 "Plexus" (Cedar Walton) – 9:02
 "Plexus" [alternate take] (Walton) – 9:10 
 "Earmon Jr." – 6:16

Personnel

 Freddie Hubbard – trumpet
 Julian Priester – trombone
 Jimmy Heath – tenor saxophone
 Cedar Walton – piano
 Larry Ridley – bass
 Philly Joe Jones – drums

Technical personnel
 Alfred Lion – producer
 Rudy Van Gelder – recording
 Francis Wolff – cover photo
 Reid Miles – cover design

References

1961 albums
Freddie Hubbard albums
Blue Note Records albums
Albums produced by Alfred Lion
Albums recorded at Van Gelder Studio